Lac de l'Oule is a lake in Hautes-Pyrénées, France. At an elevation of 1819 m, its surface area is 58 ha.

References

Lakes of Hautes-Pyrénées